Alexandra Scott Billings (born March 28, 1962) is an American actress, teacher, and singer. Billings is the second openly transgender woman to have played a transgender character on television, which she did in the 2005 made-for-TV movie Romy and Michele: In the Beginning. She is also known for portraying the recurring character Davina in the Amazon series Transparent and has played transgender characters in ER, Eli Stone, How to Get Away with Murder, Grey's Anatomy and The Conners.

Early life 
Billings was born in Illinois into a multiracial family; she is of European American, African American, and Native American ancestry. Billings' father, Robert Billings, was a music teacher at Los Angeles Harbor College and the musical director for the Los Angeles Civic Light Opera, which influenced her interest in theater. She assisted, working backstage with Carol Burnett and Yul Brynner. She also appeared in Jesus Christ Superstar and The Roar of the Greasepaint—the Smell of the Crowd. In her early adult life, Billings struggled with homelessness and cocaine and opioid addiction, and for a time participated in sex work.

Career

Stage work 
In the early 1980s, Billings worked under the stage name Shanté at the famed Baton Show Lounge in Chicago, Illinois, where she impersonated Barbra Streisand, Judy Garland, and Liza Minnelli. Winning a series of beauty contests, she was named Miss Wisconsin, Miss New York, Miss Chicago, Miss Illinois, and Miss Florida. She also served as a judge of the Miss Continental pageant in 2000 and 2001.

Most of Billings' professional work has been in Chicago theaters, most notably The Bailiwick Theater, Light Opera Works, Court Theatre, and Steppenwolf Theatre. She has collaborated on plays with such notable authors as Larry Kramer, Tina Landau, and Jamie Pachino. She has received one Joseph Jefferson Award and five After Dark Awards for her work in Chicago Theatre. Her one-person autobiographical show has toured to Boston, Chicago, Los Angeles and off Broadway. She is a former artistic associate of About Face Theatre. She performed in a pair of Billy Bermingham-written satirical farces at the Torso Theatre during the 1990s titled Shannen Doherty Shoots a Porno: A Shockumentary and Cannibal Cheerleaders on Crack, starring in the latter.

Billings is also a professional singer who performs in theaters and nightclubs throughout the United States. She recorded her second CD, The Story Goes On, in 2003. She was a recipient of the New York MAC Hanson Award for Cabaret Artist of the Year in 2004.

More recently, Billings has appeared in an autobiographical show, "S/He and Me". In fall 2018, she also appeared in The Nap at Manhattan Theatre Club, and is one of the first openly trans people to be cast in a trans role on Broadway.

In September 2019, it was announced that Billings would play the role of Madame Morrible in the Broadway musical Wicked. She is the first openly transgender person to star in the show. After the closure of Broadway during the COVID-19 pandemic, Billings appeared with several other performers on Good Morning America in fall 2021 to announce the return of several shows to Broadway, including Wicked. As of fall 2021, Billings has resumed performing the role of Morrible.

Television and film appearances 
In the early 2000s, WTTW, the PBS station in Chicago, produced a documentary about Billings' life and career, "Schoolboy to Showgirl: The Alexandra Billings Story."

She has appeared in the 2005 made-for-TV movie Romy and Michelle: A New Beginning. She has also played transgender characters in episodes of Karen Sisco, ER, Eli Stone and Grey's Anatomy.

In 2010, Billings appeared in the film FAUX, in which she commented on gay marriage spurring the economy.

In 2015, Billings appeared on season two, episode six of How to Get Away with Murder as Professor Jill Hartford.

In 2017, transgender actors and actresses, including Billings (with the help of GLAAD and ScreenCrush), were part of a film to Hollywood written by Jen Richards, asking for more and improved roles for transgender people.

In 2018, Billings played Judge Martha Wallace in the second season of Goliath.

Billings may be best known for her role as Davina in the Amazon series Transparent. The character was introduced in an early episode of season one and appeared throughout the show's run.

In 2020, Billings appeared in a recurring role as Robin, a transgender supervisor at Wellman Plastics and mentor to Darlene Conner on ABC's The Conners.

She had a recurring role as Inspector Ainsley Lowbeer in the 2022 Amazon Prime Video science fiction series The Peripheral.

Teaching 
She has taught Viewpoints, a method and approach of theater, at the Steppenwolf Summer School. She also taught at Louis University, The University of Chicago, Illinois University, the Illinois Theatre Convention, Act One Studios, and various classes and workshops around the Chicago area, as well as the Steppenwolf School West in Los Angeles California.

Billings is a theater professor at the University of Southern California in Los Angeles. Before working at USC, she was an assistant professor at California State University, Long Beach. She received her MFA from CSULB, and delivered the commencement speech for CSULB College of the Arts in 2015.

Activism 
Billings is an AIDS and LGBTQ activist and advocate for the equality of the LGBTQ community.  She encourages others to use their voices to create change within the LGBTQ community.

In 2016, Billings was awarded the Human Rights Campaign Visibility Award, which recognizes outstanding members of the LGBTQ community who live openly and freely in the public eye. After receiving the award, Billings thanked the audience, but also said, “I look around and I see you all and I cannot tell you how grateful I am that you’re here, and I have to say something to you - I think you look great, you look swell and it’s wonderful that you’re here eating the chicken - it’s delightful, but I must tell you that we have to do something more than sit and speak and talk to our neighbors and eat great food and put on fancy clothes.”

In 2017, Transparent, the hit TV show Billings stars in, won the GLAAD Media Award for Outstanding Comedy Series. When accepting the award on behalf of the cast, Billings urged the audience to talk to people who disagree with their beliefs in order to spark conversation and create change instead of staying complacent. Specifically, she called out the older LGBTQ generation and asks them to guide the younger LGBTQ generation because they will be the ones continuing the fight for equality in the future.

When delivering the commencement speech to the graduating class of the California State University, Long Beach in 2015, Billings once again emphasized the importance of voice when she told the students that it is their job is to speak loud, big, and wide in order to spread their voices.

Personal life 
Billings lives in Hollywood, California, with her wife Chrisanne, whom she initially met at age fourteen in drama class. They were married in a commitment ceremony in Chicago on December 4, 1995. Billings was chosen as the Grand Marshal for the Pride Parade in Chicago, Illinois on June 28, 2009.

Billings started her male to female transition in 1980. She has been living with HIV since 1985, and has been an advocate for HIV health initiatives, as well as trans issues and trans rights. When talking about her fight to battle AIDS, she says that she believes the reason she has survived all these years is because of her wife who stood by her, loved her, and supported her through it all. She has spoken about living with HIV in a number of interviews, including a 2016 article with her hometown paper. She also spoke to POZ magazine for a 2003 interview about life with HIV. In 2022, she published her memoir This Time for Me: A Memoir.

Filmography

Film

Television

Theatre

References

External links

Alexandra Billings at Chicago Gay and Lesbian Hall of Fame

American LGBT actors
LGBT people from Illinois
Transgender actresses
American television actresses
Actresses from Los Angeles County, California
Living people
1962 births
People from Inglewood, California
21st-century American actresses
LGBT people from California
University of Southern California faculty
People from Schaumburg, Illinois
People with HIV/AIDS
Transgender academics
American women academics
21st-century American LGBT people